Language Science Press (LSP) is an open access scholarly publishing house specializing in linguistics, formally set up in 2014. Language Science Press publishes books on a central storage and archiving server in combination with print on-demand services. Books are published under the Creative Commons CC-BY license as a standard. As of November 2022, the catalog lists 217 books in English, German, Portuguese, Spanish, or Chinese. A total of 30 books are published every year, including monographs and edited volumes.

History
Language Science Press goes back to the Open Access in Linguistics (OALI) initiative, which was started by Stefan Müller and colleagues at the Free University of Berlin in August 2012. In its preliminary stages, the initiative consisted of finding a supporters’ base within the global linguistics community.

In a second phase, a grant proposal was jointly submitted by Martin Haspelmath and Stefan Müller for the call “Open Access Monographs in the Humanities”. Funding came then from the German Research Foundation for the development of a full-fledged business model and its realization (Language Science Press) starting June 2014.

From 2016 to 2018, Language Science Press was sponsored by Humboldt University in Berlin. Later, Language Science Press was supported by 105 institutions worldwide in a first round from 2018 to 2020. Currently, 115 institutions are listed as sponsors in a second round from 2020 to 2022.

In 2022, a book they published ('A Grammar of Gyeli' by Nadine Grimm) won the prestigious Leonard Bloomfield Book Award, as awarded by the Linguistic Society of America.

Publication process

Every book published via Language Science Press goes through a predefined workflow that relies in part on a community of voluntary proofreaders. There are in total five stages:

 Submission: A first draft of the manuscript is submitted by the author(s) to the respective series's editor(s).
 Review: Two reviewers are chosen by the respective series's editor for peer review.
 Proofreading: Community proofreaders inspect the revised manuscript.
 Typesetting: A final typographic check is carried out by Language Science Press.
 Publication: The now complete book is published and made freely available according to the principles of open access.

Open commentaries and reviews and community proofreading are made possible by PaperHive. Since at least September 2020, Language Science Press has also been using docLoop, which allows for the community feedback to be turned into issues on GitHub.  All books are subject to the Generic Style Rules for Linguistics.

Setup
Language Science Press is currently organized in 30 series: 

 Advances in Historical Linguistics
 African Language Grammars and Dictionaries
Classics in Linguistics
Comprehensive Grammar Library
Computational Models of Language Evolution
Conceptual Foundations of Language Science
Contact and Multilingualism
Contemporary African Linguistics
Current Issues in Bilingualism
Empirically Oriented Theoretical Morphology and Syntax
EuroSLA Studies
History and Philosophy of the Language Sciences
Implemented Grammars
Language Variation
Languages of the Caucasus
Morphological Investigations
Niger-Congo Comparative Studies
Open Generative Syntax
Open Germanic Linguistics
Open Romance Linguistics
Open Slavic Linguistics
Phraseology and Multiword Expressions
Research on Comparative Grammar
Studies in Caribbean Languages
Studies in Diversity Linguistics
Studies in Laboratory Phonology
 Textbooks in Language Sciences 
 Topics at the Grammar-Discourse Interface 
 Topics in Phonological Diversity
Translation and Multilingual Natural Language Processing 

The publisher's Advisory Board decides upon series proposals. Authors submit their manuscripts to a specific series. The publisher's website states that each manuscript is reviewed by at least two reviewers determined by the series editors.

Partnerships
Language Science Press has a partnership with Knowledge Unlatched, a global library consortium approach to funding open access books. 

The publishing house maintains a list of supporters shown online. Notable supporters include Noam Chomsky and Steven Pinker.

Digital typography
Language Science Press uses the   editor Overleaf as a platform. For example, langsci-avm provides a specialized syntax for typesetting potentially complex attribute-value matrices (AVMs).

The source code of books is available from a GitHub repository.

See also
 University of Hawaiʻi Press
 Open Library of Humanities

References

External links
 
 Official blog
 Their github repositories
The catalog of all published books

Academic publishing companies
Open access publishers
Book publishing companies of Germany
Publishing companies of Germany
Publishing companies established in 2013
2013 establishments in Germany